Ayrshire College (Scottish Gaelic: Colaiste Siorrachd Àir) is a further education institution in Scotland. Formed in August 2013 from a merger between Ayr College, Kilmarnock College and the Largs and Kilwinning campuses of James Watt College, it serves Ayrshire and surrounding areas.

The Kilmarnock campus opened in October 2016. It was built on part of the site of the former Johnnie Walker bottling plant, following alcoholic beverage company Diageo's gifting of the location to the college.

In February 2013, the principal of Kilmarnock College, Heather Dunk, was named the principal designate of Ayrshire College.

History
Ayrshire College was established on August 1, 2013, following the merger of the three main colleges in Ayrshire – Kilmarnock College, Ayr College as well as the Kilwinning and Largs campuses of James Watt College. Ayrshire College is an incorporated College under the Further and Higher education (Scotland) Act 1992. The college is a registered charity in Scotland with a registered charity number of (SCO21177).

Campuses

Main campuses
 Ayr Campus (Dam Park, Ayr) 
 Kilmarnock Campus (Hill Street, Kilmarnock)
 Kilwinning Campus (Lauchlan Way, Kilwinning)

Other campuses
 Skills Centre for Excellence (Irvine Royal Academy, Kilwinning Road, Irvine)
 Nethermains Campus (Simpson Place, Kilwinning)

References

External links

Education in North Ayrshire
Further education colleges in Scotland
Educational institutions established in 2013
2013 establishments in Scotland
Education in East Ayrshire
Education in South Ayrshire
Buildings and structures in Ayr
Buildings and structures in Kilmarnock
Kilwinning
Buildings and structures in North Ayrshire